Arp 240 is a pair of interacting spiral galaxies located in the constellation Virgo. The two galaxies are listed together as Arp 240 in the Atlas of Peculiar Galaxies. The galaxy on the right is known as NGC 5257, while the galaxy on the left is known as NGC 5258. Both galaxies are distorted by the gravitational interaction, and both are connected by a tidal bridge, as can be seen in images of these galaxies.

References

External links 
 

Unbarred spiral galaxies
Intermediate spiral galaxies
Peculiar galaxies
Interacting galaxies
Luminous infrared galaxies
Virgo (constellation)
NGC objects
08641
48330
240